Britton Fischer (born February 25, 2004) is an American soccer player who plays as a defender for MLS Next Pro club Minnesota United FC 2.

Club career
Fischer joined the North Carolina FC academy in 2019, where he played before signing an academy contract with the club's USL League One side for the 2021 season.

He made his debut on May 22, 2021, appearing as an 86th-minute substitute in a 0–0 draw with Richmond Kickers.

On March 1, 2023, Fischer was transferred to MLS Next Pro side Minnesota United FC 2 for an undisclosed fee.

Career statistics

References

2004 births
Living people
American soccer players
Association football defenders
North Carolina FC players
North Carolina FC U23 players
MLS Next Pro players
USL League One players
Soccer players from North Carolina
Sportspeople from North Carolina
USL League Two players
21st-century American people